Pío García-Escudero Márquez, 4th Count of Badarán (born 28 October 1952) is a Spanish architect and politician who served as the 59th President of the Senate of Spain from 2011 to 2019. Since 21 May 2019, Escudero has served as the Second Vice President of the Senate.

Early life
Born in 1952 in Madrid where he was raised, he graduated from Technical University of Madrid and as an architect from Superior Technical School of Architecture of Madrid.

Political career
García-Escudero Márquez was a senator from 9 April 1996 to 2 February 1999, and again from 13 April 2004 to 26 September 2011 as a member of the People's Party.

Personal

García-Escudero Marquez was married on 15 June 1982 to María del Carmen Ramos Pérez. The couple have two children:

 Pío García-Escudero Ramos (b. 1984)
 Miguel García-Escudero Ramos (b. 1987)

He is involved in Bárcenas affair corruption scandal and appeared before court as a witness in Gürtel case trial on 26 July 2017.

Honours

Foreign honours
: Grand Cross of the Order of the Sun of Peru (27 February 2019)
: Grand Cross of the Order of Christ (Portugal)
: Grand Cross of the Order of Aviz (15 April 2018)

References

1952 births
Counts of Spain
Living people
Madrid city councillors (2003–2007)
Members of the 3rd Assembly of Madrid
Members of the 4th Assembly of Madrid
Members of the 5th Assembly of Madrid
Members of the 5th Senate of Spain
Members of the 6th Senate of Spain
Members of the 7th Senate of Spain
Members of the 8th Senate of Spain
Members of the 9th Senate of Spain
Members of the 10th Senate of Spain
Members of the 11th Senate of Spain
Members of the 12th Senate of Spain
Members of the 13th Senate of Spain
Members of the 14th Senate of Spain
Members of the People's Parliamentary Group (Assembly of Madrid)
People from Madrid
People's Party (Spain) politicians
Presidents of the Senate of Spain